Russia national cerebral palsy football team is the national cerebral football team for Russia that represents the team in international competitions.  The team has participated at multiple Paralympic Games, winning gold in the 2000 and 2012 editions.  Russia won the IFCPF World Championships in 1998, 2007, 2011 and 2015.

Background 

Russian Cerebral Palsy Football Federation (RCPFF) manages the national team.  During the 2000s, the team was one of the top four most dominant teams in the world alongside Brazil, Ukraine and Iran. In 2011 and 2012, the team was coached by Baramidze Avtandil. Russia was active internationally by 2016, and had national championships to support national team player development. National team development is supported by an International Federation of Cerebral Palsy Football (IFCPF) recognized national championship.  Recognized years for the national IFCPF recognized competition include  2010, 2011, 2012, 2013, 2014, and 2015.

In 2016, after getting an endorsement by the World AntiDoping Agency (WADA), the IFCPF Anti-Doping Code was formally amended to allow for out of competition testing.  This was done through a WADA approved Whereabouts Programme managed through ADAMS. Drawing from players in a  Registered Testing Pool, players from this country were included ahead of the 2016 Summer Paralympics in Rio.

Ranking 
In 2016, Russia was ranked 2nd in the world by the IFCPF.  In November 2014, the team was ranked number 1 in the world. In August 2013, the team was ranked number 1 in the world.  In September 2012, the team was ranked number 1 in the world.  In July 2011, the team was ranked number 2 in the world.

Players 
There have been a number of players for the Russian squad.

Results 

Russia has participated in a number of international tournaments.

IFCPF World Championships 
Russia has participated in the IFCPF World Championships.

Paralympic Games 

Russia has participated in 7-a-side football at the Paralympic Games dating back to 1996, medaling in each of their appearances at the Games.  While they had qualified to compete at the 2016 Summer Paralympics, the Russian team was suspended for the Games.  They were replaced by Iran.

Paralympic Results

References 

Cerebral Palsy
Russia at the Paralympics
National cerebral palsy football teams
Football 7-a-side teams at the 1996 Summer Paralympics
Football 7-a-side teams at the 2000 Summer Paralympics
Football 7-a-side teams at the 2004 Summer Paralympics
Football 7-a-side teams at the 2008 Summer Paralympics
Football 7-a-side teams at the 2012 Summer Paralympics